Kavaru is a village in Tõstamaa Parish, Pärnu County, in southwestern Estonia, on the coast of the Gulf of Riga. It has a population of 48 (as of 1 January 2011).

Kavaru was first mentioned in 1624 as Kawer.

References

Villages in Pärnu County